Gerald Mörken (born 2 November 1959 in Dortmund) is a German former swimmer who competed in the 1984 Summer Olympics.

References

1959 births
Living people
German male swimmers
German male breaststroke swimmers
Olympic swimmers of West Germany
Swimmers at the 1984 Summer Olympics
Sportspeople from Dortmund
World Aquatics Championships medalists in swimming
European Aquatics Championships medalists in swimming
20th-century German people